Vertebrata simulans (Polysiphonia simulans) Harvey is a small densely branched alga in the Division Rhodophyta.

Description
This small marine algae grows to a height of no more than 8 cm. the branches are dense forming tufts. It does not show a clear main axis. The central axes is surrounded by 10 to 12 pericentral cells all of the same length and is without cortication. The branches are irregularly arranged.

Habitat
Generally epiphytic at the low littoral.

References

Rhodomelaceae